The Kamangars are a Muslim community found in Northern India and Pakistan.

History and origin

Some Kamangars trace their ancestry to a tribe by the name of Bani Saad, while some claim descent from Chughtai Mughals. They migrated into Sindh, Punjab and Uttar Pradesh from Rewari in  Haryana, accompanying the Mughal armies.  Some sections claim to belong to the Quraishi community.

In North India
The traditional occupation of the Kamangar was the making of bows and arrows. They now manufacture toys made of bamboo, as well as Ta'ziya for Ashura. The community is urban and semi-urban, and many are now wage labourers. Many have also been involved in drawing pictures of Hindu gods and goddesses. They have other Backward caste status.  The community in Uttar Pradesh are found in Fatehpur, Ferozabad, Budaun, Agra, Varanasi, Sultanpur and Eta, while in Gujarat they are found in Kutch, Mandvi, Bhuj, and Mundra. In Uttar Pradesh, the community speak Urdu and various local dialects like Braj Bhasha and Khari Boli. They have a caste council that deals with disputes within their community. The community belong to the Sunni sects of Islam.

See also
 Mughal
 Khan Mughal
 Farzad Kamangar

References

Social groups of Pakistan
Social groups of Bihar
Social groups of Uttar Pradesh
Muslim communities of India
Indian people of Turkic descent
Social groups of Jammu and Kashmir
Mughal clans of Pakistan
Muslim communities of Uttar Pradesh